Water Consulting East Africa (WC EA) is a multidisciplinary consultancy with headquarters in Kigali, Rwanda. It provides water and civil engineering, management and construction services in Rwanda East Africa and further afield. WC EA is East Africa’s premier water engineering consultancy.

It was established in 2014 by the founder Jean-Paul Skoczylas. WC EA has provided services to Bechtel Corporation, USAID, UNICEF, IFC, Rwanda Cricket Stadium Foundation and Howard G. Buffet Foundation and on projects funded by DFID and the Bill & Melinda Gates Foundation.

History
Water Consulting East Africa was formed in 2014 to primarily serve the water and civil engineering market in Rwanda, East and Central Africa

Operations
Water Consulting East Africa has experience of working in Rwanda and the Democratic Republic of Congo. WC EA's key employees have experience of working across North America, Europe, Middle East and Africa.

Projects
 Rugari Water Supply, DRC – Virunga National Park/Howard G Buffet Foundation
 Private Sector Agriculture Development, Rwanda - IF
 Nasho II Irrigation Project, Rwanda – Rwandan Ministry of Agriculture/Howard G Buffet Foundation
 Rwandan Water Sector Study, Rwanda - USAID
 CBEHPP National Action Plan, Rwanda - UNICEF
 Rwanda Cricket Stadium Water Supply, Rwanda - RCSF
 Cactus Green Park, Rwanda - FONERWA
 CHAN 2016, Bechtel - Rwanda

External links
Water Consulting East Africa

Companies of Rwanda
Engineering companies of Africa
Companies established in 2014